MMFF may refer to:

Merck Molecular Force Field
Metro Manila Film Festival
MMFF (3D Printing Technology)